Battleship steel could refer to:
Types of steel used as armour on battleships:
Harvey armour
Krupp armour
Low-background steel, derived from battleships that sank before the advent of nuclear weapons testing